The C&C 40 is a series of Canadian sailboats, that were all designed by C&C Design and first built in 1968.

Production
The series were all built by C&C Yachts in Canada, but all models are now all out of production.

Design
The C&C 40 series are all recreational keelboats, built predominantly of fiberglass, with wood trim. They all have masthead sloop rigs and internally-mounted spade-type rudders.

The C&C 40 Crusader and 40-1 were related designs, although there were many variations produced on the basic designs. The 40-2 and its variants are a completely different design.

Variants
C&C 40 Crusader
This model was designed by C&C Design, introduced in 1968 and built until 1971 at Belleville Marine Yards, which became part of C&C Yachts during the production run. C&C Yachts Limited officially formed on 26 September 1969. The boat is fitted with a Universal Atomic 4 gasoline engine. The boat has a PHRF racing average handicap of 120 with a high of 102 and low of 132.
C&C 40-1
This model was based upon the C&C 40 Crusader, but with the rudder moved to the long keel and a small bowsprit added. It was designed by C&C Design and introduced in 1970. The boat is fitted with an inboard engine. The boat has a PHRF racing average handicap of 126.
C&C 40-2
This model was designed by Robert W. Ball of C&C Design, introduced in 1978, and at nearly 200 launched, was one of C&C's most successful models. It was an entirely new design from the earlier models, sharing only the C&C 40 name. An optional version was fitted with a stub keel and a centreboard. The boat is fitted with a Westerbeke diesel engine. There was also a tall mast option, with a mast about  higher. The standard keel version  has a PHRF racing average handicap of 93, the centreboard version has an average handicap of 102, the deep keel version has an average handicap of 90, the tall mast version has an average handicap of 93 and the tall mast/deep keel combination has an average handicap of 90.
C&C 40-2 AC
This "aft cabin" version of the C&C 40-2 was designed by Robert Ball, of C&C Design and introduced in 1977. The boat is fitted with a Westerbeke diesel engine. The boat has a PHRF racing average handicap of 93. In creating the aft cockpit the companion way steps were moved forward and the mainsheet traveller relocated from the coach house roof to the bridge deck. Keels available were a deep draft keel, shoal draft keel and a swing keel. There is an aft cabin that features a double berth on the port side. It is connected to the head by a door and the head has a second door to the main cabin. In the main cabin the gallery is located on the port side, with a large navigation station on the starboard side. In the main cabin there is a double berth and a pilot berth, along with a folding table. There is also a double berth in the bow. The design has a "T" cockpit with the wheel on a pedestal and inboard genoa tracks. An anchor locker is located in the bow.

Operational history
In a review of the 40-2 Michael McGoldrick wrote, "The C&C 40 ... is one of the bigger boats made by C&C over the years, and it traces its origins back to the company's experience with a custom 40 foot racing boat. It is supposed to be a responsive boat that has a reputation for being quite fast in light airs. Down below is all the room you would expect from a 40 footer, and later boats featured an aft-cabin."

See also
List of sailing boat types

Similar sailboats
Columbia 40
CS 40
Hunter 40
Hunter 40.5
Hunter 41
Marlow-Hunter 40

References

External links
 Original Factory Brochure - C&C 40-2, 2 page, colour
 Original Factory Brochure - C&C 40-2, 4 page, colour
 Original Factory Brochure - C&C 40-2 Aft Cabin, 5 page, colour

Keelboats
1960s sailboat type designs
Sailing yachts
Sailboat type designs by Robert W. Ball
Sailboat type designs by C&C Design
Sailboat types built by C&C Yachts